The Wharton County Courthouse Historic Commercial District is a  historic district in Wharton, Texas that was listed on the National Register of Historic Places in 1991.  It includes works by architects Jules Leffland and Wyatt C. Hedrick and others.  The NRHP listing included 46 contributing buildings and two contributing objects, as well as 31 non-contributing buildings and two non-contributing objects, on the blocks fronting on the courthouse square and on nearby blocks (see map on page 7 of NRHP document).

The Wharton County Courthouse itself is a three-story Art Deco building with a one-story addition.  The courthouse square was lined with pecan trees as of 1991 and has an octagonal gazebo and three memorials.

Selected buildings in the district are:
W. A. Harrison Building (1913), 200 W. Milam, built for William Alexander Harrison of prominent Harrison family
Burger-Robertson Block (1909-1919), 115-137 S. Fulton Street, consisting of six commercial buildings, three of which were designed by Victoria architect Jules Leffland.

See also

National Register of Historic Places listings in Wharton County, Texas

References

External links

Italianate architecture in Texas
Romanesque Revival architecture in Texas
Streamline Moderne architecture in the United States
Wharton County, Texas
Historic districts on the National Register of Historic Places in Texas
National Register of Historic Places in Wharton County, Texas
Courthouses on the National Register of Historic Places in Texas